Odessa in Flames (Italian: Odessa in fiamme, Romanian: Odessa în flăcări) is a 1942 Italian-Romanian propaganda war film directed by Carmine Gallone and starring Maria Cebotari, Carlo Ninchi and Filippo Scelzo. The film is about the Battle of Odessa in 1941, where the city was taken in an operation was primarily conducted by Romanian forces and elements of the German Army's 11th Army.

It is an anti-communist propaganda work focusing on a family trapped in Soviet-occupied Bessarabia and its eventual liberation by Axis forces during Operation Barbarossa. It was screened at the 1942 Venice Film Festival. 
It was made at the Cinecittà Studios in Rome. The sets were designed by the art director Guido Fiorini. Location shooting took place in Axis-occupied Odessa and Moldova as well as Romania.

Plot
Maria Cebotari played the role of Maria Teodorescu, an opera singer from Bessarabia, who is in Chișinău with her 8-year-old son at the time of the invasion. The boy is taken somewhere in Odessa. The mother is told that he will be maintained in a camp where he will be educated as a man and a Soviet. To get her son back she agrees to sing Russian songs in theaters and taverns. There, she shares pictures of her past. One such image is found by chance by her husband, who is in the Romanian army with the rank of captain. In the end, the family reunites.

Because of the invasion of Bucharest by Soviet troops in 1944 the movie was banned and the actors were arrested. Many such movies were either destroyed or censored. Nothing was heard of this movie for more than 50 years. However, it was rediscovered in the Cinecittà archives in Rome and was shown for the first time in Romania in December 2006.

Cast
 Maria Cebotari as Maria Teodorescu 
 Carlo Ninchi as Il capitano Sergio Teodorescu 
 Filippo Scelzo as Michele Smirnoff 
 Olga Solbelli as Luba 
 Rubi D'Alma as Florica, l'amante di Michele 
 George Timica as Giovanni Alexis 
 Silvia Dumitrescu-Timica as Anna, la moglie di Giovanni 
 Mircea Axente as Pietro 
 Maurizio Romitelli as Nico 
 Paolo Ferrari as Paolo 
 Gilda Marchiò as Ila 
 Giuseppe Varni as Lo scrivone 
 Checco Rissone as Gruscenko
 Adele Garavaglia as La nonna del bambino malato
 Bella Starace Sainati as La vecchietta

References

Bibliography
 Michael Laffan & Max Weiss. Facing Fear: The History of an Emotion in Global Perspective. Princeton University Press, 2012.
 Reich, Jacqueline & Garofalo, Piero. Re-viewing Fascism: Italian Cinema, 1922-1943. Indiana University Press, 2002.

External links

1942 films
1940s Italian-language films
World War II films made in wartime
Films directed by Carmine Gallone
Films shot at Cinecittà Studios
Italian black-and-white films
Italian war drama films
Italian World War II films
1940s war drama films
1942 drama films
Romanian black-and-white films
Romanian war drama films
Romanian World War II films
1940s Italian films